Staveley is a civil parish in the Borough of Chesterfield in Derbyshire, England.  The parish contains 26 listed buildings that are recorded in the National Heritage List for England.  Of these, two are listed at Grade II*, the middle of the three grades, and the others are at Grade II, the lowest grade.  The parish contains the town of Staveley, the village of Barrow Hill, and the surrounding area.  Most of the listed buildings are houses and associated structures, farmhouses and farm buildings.  The other listed buildings include churches and a cross in a churchyard, schools, a railway engine shed and a war memorial.


Key

Buildings

References

Citations

Sources

 

Lists of listed buildings in Derbyshire